San Siro is the common name of a football stadium in Milan, Italy.

San Siro may also refer to:

 San Siro, a horse racing venue in Milan
 San Siro, Milan, the district of Milan where the football stadium and the horse racing venue are located
 San Siro, Como, a municipality in the Province of Como, Italy
 Borgo San Siro, a municipality in the Province of Pavia, Italy
 San Siro (Genoa), a Roman Catholic basilica in Genoa, Italy

See also
 Siro (disambiguation)
 Saint Syrus (disambiguation)